Chijioke Akuneto (born 10 October, 1997) is a Nigerian footballer who plays for Rivers United F.C. in the Nigerian Professional Football League. He was the league’s top goalscorer in the 2021– 22 season.

Career
Akuneto played for Lagos-based MFM F.C. in the Nigeria Professional Football League in 2019 and scored four goals in his first thirteen games. In August 2019 he was signed by Sunshine Staes.

Akuneto played for Heartland FC during the 2020-21 Nigeria Professional Football League season and he scored five goals and was also credited with an assist from his 24 league games.

After joining Rivers United, in March 2022 he scored the first hat-trick of the entire 2021–22 Nigeria Professional Football League season. Akuneto would ultimately go on to score 19 goals during the 2021–22 campaign, making him comfortably the league’s top scorer, three goals clear of any rivals.

International career
In July 2022  he was called into the Nigerian squad for the 2022 African Nations Championship qualification matches against Ghana played in August and September 2022. After a 3-1 first league defeat, Akuneto scored his first goal in a Nigerian shirt in the 94th minute of the second leg to secure the match 2-0 and send the tie to a penalty shoot-out, which Ghana won.

Personal life
Akuneto dedicated a goal he scored on 1 April, 2019 for MFM F.C. to the newborn child he and his wife Temitope had lost in the previous 24 hours. He stated he had only played in the match on his wife’s wishes.

Honours

Rivers United
 Nigeria Professional Football League: 2021-2022.
 NPFL Eunisell golden boot award: 2021–2022.

References

External links

1997 births
Living people
Nigerian footballers
Association football midfielders